Jeff Place is the Grammy-award-winning Archivist and Curator at the Smithsonian Center for Folklife and Cultural Heritage. He and Anthony Seeger (Director Emeritus) were the first two full-time employees hired in 1987 when the Smithsonian acquired Folkways Records from the estate of Folkways founder Moses Asch.

Place has been involved in the compilation of more than sixty CDs of American music for Folkways. He won three Grammy Awards, two (“Best Album Notes” and “Best Historical Album”) in 1997 for Anthology Of American Folk Music - 1997 Expanded Edition, and one (Producer) for Pete Seeger: The Smithsonian Collection in 2019.   He was Grammy-nominated for four other productions (eight nominations total): The Best Of Broadside 1962-1988: Anthems Of The American Underground From The Pages Of Broadside Magazine (2000), Woody At 100: The Woody Guthrie Centennial Collection (2012), Lead Belly: The Smithsonian Folkways Collection (2015), and Pete Seeger: The Smithsonian Collection (2019).

Discography
Folkways: The Original Vision (audio recording), Smithsonian/Folkways 40001 (co-producer), 1989. National Association of Independent Record Distributors Indie Award, Honorable Mention, Historical release 1989.

The Doc Watson Family (audio recording), Smithsonian/Folkways 40012 (co-producer, liner notes), 1990. National Association of Independent Record Distributors Indie Award, Honorable Mention, Historical release 1990; The Music Independent, Independent Country record of the year nominee.

Music in the Glen: The 1990 Washington Irish Festival, (audiorecording), Washington Irish Festival, 1990 (producer)

Roots of Rhythm and Blues: A Tribute to the Robert Johnson Era (audio recording), Columbia 48584 (production assistant), 1992. Grammy Award nominee, Best Traditional Blues Recording.

Original Folkways Recordings of Doc Watson and Clarence Ashley (audio recording), Smithsonian/Folkways 40029/30 (co-producer), 1994

Long Ways to Travel (The Unreleased Woody Guthrie Sessions) (audio recording), Smithsonian/Folkways 40046 (co-producer, liner notes), 1994. The American Folklore Society McCallum Prize winner.

That's Why We're Marching: World War II and the American Folk Song Movement (audio recording) Woody Guthrie, Leadbelly, and the Almanac Singers, Smithsonian/Folkways 40021 (producer, liner notes), 1996

Where Did You Sleep Last Night?: The Lead Belly Legacy Vol. 1 (audio recording) Lead Belly, Smithsonian/Folkways 40044 (co-producer, liner notes), 1996

Ballads of Sacco and Vanzetti (audio recording) Woody Guthrie, Smithsonian/Folkways 40060 (co-compiler of reissue), 1996

This Land is Your Land: The Asch Recordings Vol. 1, (audio recording) Woody Guthrie, Smithsonian/Folkways 40100 (co-producer and liner notes), 1997.

The Bourgeois Blues: The Lead Belly Legacy Vol. 2 (audio recording) Lead Belly, Smithsonian/Folkways 40045 (liner notes and producer), 1997.

The Anthology of American Folk Music, (audio recording and liner notes) Smithsonian/Folkways 40090 (liner notes, co-producer), 1997 (1997 edition of 1952 six volume set) Grammy winner- Best Historical Release; Grammy winner- Best Album Notes; Indie winner- Best Liner Notes; Indie winner- Best Historical Release

Muleskinner Blues: The Asch Recordings Vol. 2 (audio recording) Woody Guthrie, Smithsonian/Folkways 40101 (co-producer, liner notes), 1997

Shout On: The Lead Belly Legacy Vol. 3 (audio recording) Lead Belly, Smithsonian/Folkways 40104 (producer and liner notes), 1998.

Free and Equal Blues (audio recording) Josh White, Smithsonian/Folkways 40081 (compiler), 1998

Hard Traveling: The Asch Recordings Vol. 3 (audio recording), Woody Guthrie, Smithsonian/Folkways 40102 (co-producer and liner notes), 1998.

Buffalo Skinners: The Asch Recordings Vol. 4 (audio recording), Woody Guthrie, Smithsonian/Folkways 40103 (co-producer and liner notes), 1999.

The Harry Smith Connection: A Live Tribute to the Anthology of American Folk Music (audio recording), Various artists, Smithsonian Folkways 40085 (co-producer and liner notes), 1998. Indie winner- Best Americana Release.

Lead Belly Sings for Children, (audio recording), Lead Belly, Smithsonian/ Folkways 45047 (reissue compiler, liner notes), 1999.

The Asch Recordings (4 CD boxed set- audio recordings), Woody Guthrie, Smithsonian/Folkways 40112 (co-producer and liner notes), 1999. Indie nominations, Best Album Notes, Best Historical.

Trouble in Mind, (audio recording, Bill Broonzy, Smithsonian/Folkways 40131 (producer and liner notes), 2000.

The Best of Broadside (5-CD box set audio recording), various artists, Smithsonian/Folkways 40130 (co-producer and author of most of 160 page book), 2000. rammy nominations, Best Album notes, Best historical release. Indie nominations, Best historical release, Indie winner, Best liner notes, Best packaging.

Fast Folk: A Community of Singers and Songwriters, (audio recording), Smithsonian/Folkways 40135 (co-producer and liner notes), 2002.

Classic Bluegrass on Smithsonian Folkways, (audio recording), Smithsonian Folkways 40092 (co-producer and liner notes), 2002.

America's Favorite Ballads, Vol. 1, Pete Seeger (audio recording), Smithsonian Folkways 40150 (co-producer and liner notes), 2002

America's Favorite Ballads, Vol. 2, Pete Seeger (audio recording), Smithsonian Folkways 40151 (co-producer and liner notes), 2003

Classic Mountain Songs from Smithsonian Folkways (audiorecording), Smithsonian Folkways 40094 (producer and liner notes), 2002.

Classic Old-Time Music from Smithsonian Folkways (audiorecording), Smithsonian Folkways 40093 (producer and liner notes), 2003

Spain in My Heart: Songs of the Spanish Civil War (audiorecording), Appleseed, 2003 (liner notes)

Classic Maritime Music from Smithsonian Folkways (audiorecording), Smithsonian Folkways 40053 (producer and liner notes), 2004

Classic Folk from Smithsonian Folkways (audiorecording), Smithsonian Folkways 40110 (producer and liner notes, 2004

America's Favorite Ballads, Vol. 3 Pete Seeger(audiorecording), Smithsonian Folkways 40152 (co-producer and liner notes), 2004

Classic Bluegrass from Smithsonian Folkways, Vol. 2,(audiorecording), Smithsonian Folkways 40163 (co-producer and liner notes), 2005

Folkways: The Original Vision, revised edition (audio recording), Smithsonian/Folkways 40000 (co-producer and liner notes), 2005

Classic Railroad Songs from Smithsonian Folkways (audiorecording), Smithsonian Folkways 40192 (producer and liner notes), 2006

Classic Labor Songs from Smithsonian Folkways (audiorecording), Smithsonian Folkways  (co-producer and liner notes), 2006

Down Home Saturday Night (audiorecording), Smithsonian Folkways 40182 (co-producer and liner notes), 2006

America's Favorite Ballads, Vol. 4 Pete Seeger(audiorecording), Smithsonian Folkways 40153 (co-producer and liner notes), 2006

Harry Smith Project, Live (boxed set) (audiorecording and DVD), Shout Factory 826663, (liner notes), 2006

Classic Old-Time Fiddle from Smithsonian Folkways (audiorecording), Smithsonian Folkways 40193 (co-producer and liner notes), 2007

If You Ain’t Got the Do-Re-Mi: Songs of Rags and Riches (audiorecording, Smithsonian Folkways 40195 (Co-producer and liner notes), 2007

America's Favorite Ballads, Vol. 5 Pete Seeger(audiorecording), Smithsonian Folkways 40154 (co-producer and liner notes), 2007 (in press)

America's Favorite Ballads, Pete Seeger(boxed set)(audiorecording), Smithsonian Folkways 40155 (co-producer and liner notes), 2009

Classic Piano Blues from Smithsonian Folkways (audiorecording), Smithsonian Folkways 40196 (co-producer and liner notes), 2008

Classic Protest Songs from Smithsonian Folkways (audiorecording), Smithsonian Folkways 40197 (co-producer and liner notes). 2009

Rappahannock Blues John Jackson (audiorecording), Smithsonian Folkways 40181(co-producer and liner notes), 2009

Live at Bowdoin College Pete Seeger (audiorecording) Smithsonian Folkways 40184(producer and liner notes), 2012 (Independent Music award nominee, Best Live Performance, 2013)

Classic American Ballads from Smithsonian Folkways (audiorecording), Smithsonian Folkways 40190 (producer and liner notes), 2015

Classic Appalachian Blues from Smithsonian Folkways (audio recording), Smithsonian Folkways 40198 (co-producer and liner notes), 2009 (Independent Music Award, Best Album Compilation)

Rising Sun Melodies, Ola Belle Reed and Family (audiorecording), Smithsonian Folkways 40202 (producer and liner notes), 2010 (Independent Music Award, Best reissue album)

Golden Kids Rules (Chip Taylor) (audiorecording) Smithsonian Folkways 45071 (liner notes), 2011

Classic Harmonica Blues (co-producer and liner notes)(audio recording), Smithsonian Folkways 40204, 2012

Woody at 100: The Smithsonian Woody Guthrie Centennial Collection (Co-author and producer) (Book and audiorecording), Smithsonian Folkways 40200, 2012 (Grammy nominee, Best Historical recording; Grammy winner, Best Box Set Recording Package; Independent Music award nominee, Best Compilation Album)

Classic African-American Songsters, (audiorecording) (co-producer and liner notes)(audio recording), Smithsonian Folkways 40211, 2014 (Independent Music Award, Best Compilation, 2015)

Down in Washington Square: The Smithsonian Folkways Collection (Dave Van Ronk) (audiorecording) (producer and annotator), Smithsonian Folkways 40213, 2013

Classic Banjo from Smithsonian Folkways, (co-producer and liner notes)(audio recording), Smithsonian Folkways 40209, 2013

Lead Belly: The Smithsonian Collection (co-producer and author) (book and box set), (audiorecording) (Grammy Award nominee, Best Album Notes) Smithsonian Folkways, 40201, 2014

Classic American Ballads (producer and liner notes) (audiorecording) Smithsonian Folkways 40215, 2015

Pete Seeger: The Smithsonian Centennial Collection (co-producer and author) (book and box set), (audiorecording) Smithsonian Folkways, 40225, 2019 (in press)

Classic Folk Songs for Children (producer and liner notes) (audiorecording) Smithsonian Folkways 40580, 2015

Classic English and Scottish Ballads from the Frances James Child Collection (producer and liner notes) (audiorecording) Independent Music Award, Best Compilation) Smithsonian Folkways 40218, 2017

Roll Columbia: Woody Guthrie's 26 Northwest Songs (liner notes) (audiorecording) Smithsonian Folkways 40226, 2017

Lead Belly, Baby! (Dan Zanes and Friends) (liner notes) (audiorecording) Smithsonian Folkways 45083, 2017

Hot Jazz, Cool Blues and Hard-Hitting Songs (Barbara Dane)(co-producer and liner notes) (audiorecording) Smithsonian Folkways 40227, 2017

Epilogue: A Tribute to John Duffey (liner notes) (audio recording) Smithsonian Folkways 40228, 2018, 13 pp. (Best Liner Notes: International Bluegrass Music Awards) 

Pete Seeger: The Smithsonian Centennial Collection (co-producer and author) (6 CD set audiorecording) (book and box set), Smithsonian Folkways, 40225, 2019 (Grammy Winner: Best Historical); Grammy nominee: Best Album Notes) 

Jazz Fest: The New Orleans Jazz and Heritage Festival (co-author and producer) (5 CD set audio recording and book) Smithsonian Folkways 40250, 2019, 136 pp. 

The Social Power of Music (co-author and producer) 4 CD set (audiorecording and book) Smithsonian Folkways 40231, 2019, 124 pp. 

A Living Tradition: A Selection from Folk-Legacy Records (audiorecording)  (liner notes) Smithsonian Folkways FLG02001, 2019 

Take Me Back to the Range: Selections from the Western Jubilee Recording Company (audiorecording) (liner notes) Smithsonian Folkways WJRC019876, 2020 

The Village Out West: The Lost Tapes of Alan Oakes (co-producer and liner notes)(audiorecording) Smithsonian Folkways 40245, 2021

References

Year of birth missing (living people)
Living people
American archivists
Smithsonian Institution people